The 1976–77 Liga Femenina de Baloncesto was the 14th edition of the Spanish premier women's basketball championship. Twelve teams took part in the championship and Celta de Vigo won its first title. Medicina Hispalense and Esclavas Textil Pascual were relegated. Mataró Famosette and Medina Lleida renounced at the end of the season.

Regular season

References
Hispaligas

External links
Official website

Femenina
Liga Femenina de Baloncesto seasons
Spain
Spain